In geometry, the order-4 heptagonal tiling is a regular tiling of the hyperbolic plane. It has Schläfli symbol of {7,4}.

Symmetry 
This tiling represents a hyperbolic kaleidoscope of 7 mirrors meeting as edges of a regular heptagon. This symmetry by orbifold notation is called *2222222 with 7 order-2 mirror intersections. In Coxeter notation can be represented as [1+,7,1+,4], removing two of three mirrors (passing through the heptagon center) in the [7,4] symmetry.

The kaleidoscopic domains can be seen as bicolored heptagons, representing mirror images of the fundamental domain. This coloring represents the uniform tiling t1{7,7} and as a quasiregular tiling is called a heptaheptagonal tiling.

Related polyhedra and tiling 

This tiling is topologically related as a part of sequence of regular tilings with heptagonal faces, starting with the heptagonal tiling, with Schläfli symbol {6,n}, and Coxeter diagram , progressing to infinity.

This tiling is also topologically related as a part of sequence of regular polyhedra and tilings with four faces per vertex, starting with the octahedron, with Schläfli symbol {n,4}, and Coxeter diagram , with n progressing to infinity.

References
 John H. Conway, Heidi Burgiel, Chaim Goodman-Strass, The Symmetries of Things 2008,  (Chapter 19, The Hyperbolic Archimedean Tessellations)

See also

Square tiling
Tilings of regular polygons
List of uniform planar tilings
List of regular polytopes

External links 

 Hyperbolic and Spherical Tiling Gallery
 KaleidoTile 3: Educational software to create spherical, planar and hyperbolic tilings
 Hyperbolic Planar Tessellations, Don Hatch

Heptagonal tilings
Hyperbolic tilings
Isogonal tilings
Isohedral tilings
Order-4 tilings
Regular tilings